More American Graffiti is a 1979 American coming-of-age comedy film written and directed by Bill L. Norton, produced by Howard Kazanjian. It is the sequel to the 1973 film American Graffiti. Whereas the first film followed a group of friends during the summer evening before they set off for college, this film shows where they end up a few years later on New Years Eve.

Most of the main cast members from the first film returned for the sequel, including Candy Clark, Ron Howard, Paul Le Mat, Cindy Williams, Mackenzie Phillips, Charles Martin Smith, Bo Hopkins, and Harrison Ford. Richard Dreyfuss was the only principal cast member from the original film not to appear in the sequel. It was the final live-action theatrical film in which Ron Howard would play a credited, named character.

Plot

The film, set over the course of four consecutive New Year's Eves from 1964 to 1967, depicts scenes from each of these years, intertwined with one another as though events happen simultaneously. The audience is protected from confusion by the use of a distinct cinematic style for each section. For example, the 1966 sequences echo the movie of Woodstock using split screens and multiple angles of the same event simultaneously on screen, the 1965 sequences (set in Vietnam) shot hand-held on grainy  super 16 mm film designed to resemble war reporters' footage.  The film attempts to memorialize the 1960s with sequences that recreate the sense and style of those days with references to Haight-Ashbury, the campus peace movement, the beginnings of the modern woman's liberation movement and the accompanying social revolt. One character burns his draft card, showing a younger audience what so many Americans had done on the television news ten years before the movie's release. Other characters are shown frantically disposing of their marijuana before a traffic stop as a police officer pulls them over, and another scene shows the police overreaction during an anti-Vietnam protest.

The storylines and fates of the main characters include the following:
 New Year's Eve 1964: John Milner is a drag-strip racer and falls in love with Eva, an attractive young woman from Iceland who speaks almost no English. Regardless, Milner does his best to communicate with her. He is briefly visited at the dragstrip by Steve, Laurie, Terry and Debbie, with Laurie pregnant and Terry in a military uniform, going to ship out to Vietnam the same night. Epilogue: Milner wins the final competition of the season on New Year's Eve 1964. Later that night, he is shown driving his trademark yellow deuce coupe down a long, hilly road with another vehicle's headlights coming the opposite direction. After disappearing over a small hill, neither Milner's taillights nor the approaching car's headlights are seen again, hinting that this may have been the crash in which Milner was killed. The anniversary of Milner's death is mentioned in both the 1965 and 1966 sequences.
 New Year's Eve 1965: Terry "The Toad" Fields is in Vietnam and wants desperately to get out of the war and the abuse of his superiors, attempting to injure himself to do so. His desperation escalates after Joe Young (the leader of The Pharaohs, the lowrider gang of the previous film) is killed by a sniper in Vietnam, after promising to make Fields a Pharaoh once they return to civilian life. Epilogue: Fields fakes his own death and deserts for Europe; his superiors believe him to be dead in 1965, as do Debbie in 1966 and Steve and Laurie in 1967.
 New Year's Eve 1966: Free-spirited Debbie "Deb" Dunham has switched from Old Harper whisky to marijuana and has given up her platinum blonde persona for one as a hippie/groupie. She misses Terry, mentioning that they were planning to get married before he went MIA in Vietnam. She is currently dating another hippie, Lance Harris, and wants to get married, but he isn't interested. At the beginning of the storyline, as they drive around San Francisco, they get pulled over by Bob Falfa, the drag racer from the first movie who has gone on to become a SFPD motorcycle patrolman, and arrests Lance for possession of a marijuana joint. She bails him out, but he still isn't interested at the idea of marriage, and acts distant towards her. She then joins some hippies of the band "Electric Haze" on a long, strange trip running over garbage cans, and they end up in a country-and-western bar. Epilogue: Dancing at the country-and-western bar, Debbie sees Lance dancing with another woman, so she hits him in the face and dumps him, causing a bar fight, and later joins the Electric Haze on another trip, as they go to watch the sunset. She ends up getting a full-time job as lead singer of a country-and-western music group.
 New Year's Eve 1967: Steve Bolander and Laurie Henderson are now married with two children (it is implied they married because of Laurie's unplanned pregnancy), and living in the suburbs, but their relationship is strained by her insistence that she start her own career. Steve forbids it, saying he wants her to be a mom to their young twins.  Way beyond the end of her rope, Laurie leaves Steve and goes to stay with her brother Andy, who with his girlfriend Vicki (played by Cindy Williams' real-life sister, Carol-Ann Williams) is participating in an anti-war protest on a college campus, and is unsympathetic to her concerns. However, as Andy goes to the protest, he forgets his wallet behind and calls her to ask her to retrieve it. However, when she finds out that Andy is going to burn his draft card, she refuses to give it to him, just as the campus is surrounded by the police, and attempts to leave. She criticizes Andy's anti-war protest actions, saying that if the war was ended, Terry would have "died" for nothing. As they evade the police on the campus, Steve arrives, they embrace and he agrees to let her work, albeit in a few years, causing another argument between them and they are detained by the police. Epilogue: As the night falls, with Laurie, Vicki and all the female detainees held in a prison bus, Steve talks to her through the bus window bars, agreeing to let her work if she wants and they reconcile. However, as they attempt to convince the police that they are not demonstrators, a policeman hits the bus window bars with a truncheon, barely missing Laurie's fingers. When Steve tries to intervene, the policeman hits him in the chest, sparking a riot, and Steve and Andy escape, driving the bus off the campus. Steve, Laurie, Andy and Vicki watch the Times Square Ball drop on a TV in a store window. Steve continues to work as an insurance agent and Laurie becomes the head of a consumer group.
The final scene of the movie shows Steve, Laurie, Andy and Vicki in front of the television store, Debbie and the Electric Haze in the band's van and Terry walking alone AWOL, all singing "Auld Lang Syne". Also, Milner is seen driving in his deuce coupe, listening to it on the radio, as he drives down the long, hilly road.

Wolfman Jack briefly reprised his role, but in voice only. The drag racing scenes were filmed at the Fremont Raceway, later Baylands Raceway Park (now the site of automobile dealerships), in Fremont, California.

Cast
 Paul Le Mat as John Milner
 Cindy Williams as Laurie Henderson-Bolander
 Candy Clark as Debbie Dunham
 Ron Howard as Steve Bolander
 Mackenzie Phillips as Carol "Rainbow" Morrison
 Charles Martin Smith as Terry "The Toad" Fields
 Bo Hopkins as Joe "Little Joe" Young
 Anna Bjorn as Eva
 Scott Glenn as Newt
 Mary Kay Place as Teensa
 Wolfman Jack as Himself
 Richard Bradford as Major Creech
 Harrison Ford as Officer Bob Falfa (uncredited)
 James Houghton as Sinclair
 Manuel Padilla, Jr. as Carlos
 Will Seltzer as Andy Henderson
 Jonathan Gries as Ron
 John Lansing as Lance Harris
 Monica Tenner as "Moonflower"
 Carol-Ann Williams as Vikki Townsend
 Delroy Lindo as Army Sergeant
 Rosanna Arquette as Girl In Commune
 Naomi Judd as Girl On Bus
 Tom Baker as a Police Officer
 Steve Evans as Racetrack Announcer
 Wayne Coy as Safety Safari

Production
After the success of the original film, George Lucas, who directed American Graffiti, felt that he should direct a sequel. However, his colleague Gary Kurtz and the film's producer Francis Ford Coppola declined to make a sequel since sequels were not as well received. Lucas shelved the sequel to work on Star Wars and Raiders of the Lost Ark.
 
After the success of Star Wars, Universal City Studios president Sid Sheinberg felt that American Graffiti could have a sequel. Lucas was initially reluctant to do a sequel, but after moved by his acquaintance Howard Kazanjian, he agreed to do so. Lucas felt that he should not direct the film due to various circumstances, such as handling his company's financing, developing Radioland Murders with Willard Huyck and Gloria Katz, whom he had worked with on the film, and writing the screenplay of The Empire Strikes Back and planning his Indiana Jones franchise with fellow director Steven Spielberg. Finding a director was problematic for Lucas and Kazanjian. Kazanjian's top choice was John Landis, who refused to work on it. Lucas’ professor Irvin Kershner was also considered, but rejected the offer due to his lack of experience in comedy. Lucas considered Robert Zemeckis, who had finished directing his first feature film I Wanna Hold Your Hand, but he turned down the offer. Bill L. Norton was picked by Lucas as being suitable due to his California upbringing and experience with comedy. Lucas and Kazanjian asked him to do a screenplay, which Norton quickly accepted. Lucas was involved in the production by acting as the executive producer, editing both Norton's screenplay and supervising the finished motion picture, and even setting up a camera for sequences set in the Vietnam War.

Home media

It was released on DVD in September 2003 and once more as a double feature with American Graffiti (1973) in January 2004. It was released on Digital in 2011. It was released on Blu-ray for Europe in May 2012 and for North America in June 2018.

Soundtrack
The film also featured a 24-track soundtrack featuring music from the movie along with voice-over tracks of Wolfman Jack. The soundtrack is out of print and has never been released on CD.
Side One
"Heat Wave" – Martha and the Vandellas
"Moon River" – Andy Williams
"Mr. Tambourine Man" – The Byrds
"My Boyfriend's Back" – The Angels
"Sounds of Silence" – Simon & Garfunkel
"Season of the Witch" – Donovan
Side Two
"Stop in the Name of Love" – The Supremes
"Strange Brew" – Cream
"Just Like a Woman" – Bob Dylan
"Respect" – Aretha Franklin
"She's Not There" – The Zombies
"96 Tears" – ? and the Mysterians
Side Three
"Pipeline" – The Chantays
"Since I Fell for You" – Lenny Welch
"Beechwood 4-5789" – The Marvellettes
"Mr. Lonely" – Bobby Vinton
"Cool Jerk" – The Capitols
"I Feel Like I’m Fixin’ to Die Rag" – Country Joe and The Fish
Side Four
"The Ballad of the Green Berets" – Barry Sadler
"My Guy" – Mary Wells
"I'm a Man" – Doug Sahm
"Hang On Sloopy" – The McCoys (with Voice-Overs by Wolfman Jack)
"When a Man Loves a Woman" – Percy Sledge
"Like a Rolling Stone" – Bob Dylan

A fictional band named Electric Haze featuring Doug Sahm appears in the film, most notably performing the Bo Diddley song "I'm a Man".

An earlier album, also titled More American Graffiti, was an official album sequel to the first soundtrack to American Graffiti. The album (MCA 8007) was released in 1975, four years before the film sequel of the same name was released. While only one of the songs in this album was actually used in the 1973 motion picture, this collection was compiled and approved by George Lucas for commercial release. In 1976, MCA Records released a third and final Various Artists double album set titled: American Graffiti Vol. III (MCA 8008). Unlike the first two albums, American Graffiti Vol. III does not include dialogue with Wolfman Jack.

Reception

Box office
More American Graffiti opened on August 3, 1979, the same weekend as Apocalypse Now and Monty Python's Life of Brian. The Numbers puts the gross at $8.1 million, and Box Office Mojo at $15 million. Despite its minor box office success, its gross was nowhere near as high as that of American Graffiti, even though Ron Howard, Cindy Williams and Harrison Ford were bigger stars (due to their major roles in the TV hits Happy Days and Laverne & Shirley and the film Star Wars) in 1979 than they had been in 1973.

Critical reception 
The film received negative reviews from critics, in contrast to the critical acclaim received by its predecessor. Rotten Tomatoes reported that  of critics were positive based on  reviews.

Janet Maslin of The New York Times called it "grotesquely misconceived, so much so that it nearly eradicates fond memories of the original ... The times — the story is scattered like buckshot from 1964 to 1967 — have grown dangerous, but these people haven't awakened at all. They're still the same fun-loving rock-and-rollers, and there's nothing they can't trivialize. So here is a comic look at campus rioting. Here are the beach party aspects of the Vietnam War." Dale Pollock of Variety stated in his review that "More American Graffiti may be one of the most innovative and ambitious films of the last five years, but by no means is it one of the most successful ... without a dramatic glue to hold the disparate story elements together, Graffiti is too disorganized for its own good, and the cross-cutting between different film styles only accentuates the problem." Gene Siskel of the Chicago Tribune gave the film 2 stars out of 4 and called it "one long confusing movie" that is "really too ambitious for its own good." On Sneak Previews, Roger Ebert said he thought it was a "much better film" than Siskel did, that he "had no trouble following it" and that "it's a film worth seeing."

Charles Champlin of the Los Angeles Times was also positive, writing that "the protagonists are affecting as before and More American Graffiti is an uncommonly evocative trip back to our common past—a stirring reminder in both style and substance of what we've been through." Gary Arnold of The Washington Post wrote "All this fussy, arbitrary switching of scenes, years and aspect ratios may wow them back in film school, but the complicated framework reveals nothing but one inconsequential or misleading vignette after another. Norton doesn't achieve a true dramatic convergence of parallel stories; and his historical vision is confined to cheerleading reaffirmations of all the old counterculture cliches about war, cops, Women's Liberation, you name it." Veronica Geng of The New Yorker called the film "a mess of time shifts and pointless, confusing split-screen techniques that make the images look dinky instead of multiplying their impact. For as busy a movie I have seen, it is visually one of the most boring. Norton trades in the grammar of moving pictures for a formula that says the sixties equals fragmentation equals split screen—and split screen we get; baby's first jigsaw puzzles of simultaneous action, until we long for a simple cut from a moving car to a closeup of the driver." David Ansen of Newsweek wrote "This is all very film-school fancy, but what does it mean? Alas, precious little. 'More' in this case is decidedly less. Once you get used to the cross-cutting — which is rather like switching channels between four different TV shows — the realization dawns that none of the segments is particularly interesting."

Lucas reflected on the experience in 1997 during the production of Star Wars: Episode I – The Phantom Menace, remarking to Frank Oz: "You just never know on these things. I did a More American Graffiti; it made ten cents. Just failed miserably."

In 2021, The Guardians Matt Mitchell wrote about the film, by then "largely forgotten", for the newspaper's "Hear Me Out" series, in which critics argue for more favorable receptions for films often seen as artistic failures. He argued that its commercial failure was all but certain given its box office competition on opening weekend, and that it suffered by association with most sequels at the time being perceived as financially motivated since they were not part of studio's business models yet. "More American Graffiti is an experimental love-letter to teenage omnipotence becoming adult mortality", centered around Milner's death and the characters in the later storylines processing it. "There is a beautiful melancholia lurking beneath the comedic surface. It's an empathetic look at the distances in which our sorrows can migrate."

References

External links
 
 
 
 George Lucas' Weirdest & Wildest Sequel - video essay by The Royal Ocean Film Society on YouTube

1979 films
1970s coming-of-age comedy-drama films
1970s teen films
American coming-of-age comedy-drama films
American teen comedy films
American sequel films
American auto racing films
1970s English-language films
Films about deserters
Films produced by Howard Kazanjian
Films set in 1964
Films set in 1965
Films set in 1966
Films set in 1967
Films set in California
Films set in San Francisco
Films set in the San Francisco Bay Area
Lucasfilm films
Films set around New Year
Universal Pictures films
Vietnam War films
Beach party films
1979 comedy films
1979 drama films
Films set in the 1960s
Films directed by Bill L. Norton
1970s American films